Molly Grace McCage (Born February 2, 1994) is an American volleyball player. She played for the United States women's volleyball team.

Career

College
She played for University of Texas at Austin.

National team

She participated in the 2018 FIVB Volleyball Women's Nations League.

Professional clubs

On a club level, she played for VC Wiesbaden, and VC Stuttgart. As of 2022, her current club is Athletes Unlimited.

Awards

Individual

2022 Athletes Unlimited "Best Middle Blocker"

References

External links 
 Player info Team USA
 FIVB profile

1994 births
Living people
American women's volleyball players
American expatriate sportspeople in Germany
Expatriate volleyball players in Germany
Texas Longhorns women's volleyball players
Middle blockers